Uno von Troil (24 February 1746 in Stockholm – 1803) was the Church of Sweden Archbishop of Uppsala 1786–1803.

Biography
He was the son of Samuel Troilius, who had also been archbishop. He was known for great wit at a young age. After studies and travels abroad to the Netherlands,  Göttingen, and Iceland (accompanied by James Lind, Joseph Banks, Daniel Solander and others), he returned home and was ordained priest in 1773. In 1775 he was appointed court chaplain. He married in 1776. In 1778 he became vicar of Storkyrkan church in Stockholm. In 1780 he was consecrated bishop of Linköping.
He was appointed as archbishop in 1786, at the age of 40. As such, he was also the Speaker of the Clergy in the Riksdag of the Estates until his death. He was also a member of several scientific societies, and was a benefactor of such throughout his life. He was president of Pro Fide et Christianismo, a Christian education society.

See also 
List of Archbishops of Uppsala

References

Other sources
  Svenskt biografiskt handlexikon, article Uno von Troil In Swedish

External links

 Troil, Uno von (1777) Bref rörande en resa til Island – digital facsimile from Linda Hall Library

1746 births
1803 deaths
People from Stockholm
Lutheran archbishops of Uppsala
Lutheran bishops of Linköping
18th-century Lutheran archbishops
19th-century Lutheran archbishops
Burials at Uppsala old cemetery
Members of the Riksdag of the Estates